Elva is a comune (municipality) in the Province of Cuneo in the Italian region Piedmont, located about  southwest of Turin and about  northwest of Cuneo.

Elva borders the following municipalities: Bellino, Casteldelfino, Prazzo, Sampeyre, and Stroppo. The Pelvo d'Elva mountain is located in the communal territory.

Flemish painter Hans Clemer was active here: some of his works can be seen in the late-Romanesque parish church.

References

Cities and towns in Piedmont